A primary atmosphere is an atmosphere of a planet that forms by accretion of gaseous matter from the accretion disc of the planet's sun. Planets such as Jupiter and Saturn have primary atmospheres. Primary atmospheres are very thick compared to secondary atmospheres like the one found on Earth. The primary atmosphere was lost on the terrestrial planets due to a combination of surface temperature, mass of the atoms and escape velocity of the planet.

References

Atmosphere
Planetary atmospheres
Atmospheric sciences